Brighenti is an Italian surname. Notable people with the surname include:

Andrea Brighenti (born 1987), Italian footballer
Nicolò Brighenti (born 1989), Italian footballer
Sergio Brighenti (born 1932), Italian footballer and manager

Italian-language surnames